Tyers may refer to:

People
 Jonathan Tyers (1702–1767), owner of Vauxhall Gardens and the Denbies estate
 Charles Tyers (1806–1870), explorer of Australia
 J.H. Tyers, English swimmer dominant in 1890s
 Kathy Tyers (born 1952), American author

Places
 Tyers, Victoria, a small town in Australia named after Charles Tyers.
 Tyers River, river in West Gippsland, Victoria, Australia
 Mount Tyers, a low peak of Mount Baw Baw, Australia